Shastra is a 1996 Indian Hindi-language action film directed by Sanjay Khanna. The film stars Sunil Shetty and Anjali Jathar. The film  at the box office.

Plot
Vijay Khanna sole ambition is to become a collector like his father was. He is concentrating completely on his studies except for a few disturbances by Pooja who loves him and wants to marry him. Vijay always believed that his parents were in fact murdered and not killed in an accident, by their old faithful security officer Babu. Vijay Khanna starts searching for Babu, and finally when he finds him, Babu tells him that he was merely used as a pawn to cover up his parents' murder and the actual killer is roaming freely, and only one man can lead Vijay to the killer and that is Girdhari in Khandala. But before Vijay can find the truth, Girdhari is killed. Vijay and Babu start working in a casino owned by Shanti Prasad. There the local don Rana becomes their enemy, who is after Shanti Prasad's casino and Vijay's life. Finally when Vijay decides to leave Khandala, he learns of the actual murderers. Vijay loses Babu in the fight. Now, Vijay is alone to fight with his enemies. Eventually, he managed to track down the killer of his parents.

Cast
 Sunil Shetty as Vijay Khanna  
 Anjali Jathar as Pooja Prasad 
 Danny Denzongpa as Babu
 Farida Jalal as Aunty
 Anupam Kher as Shanti Prasad 
 Mohan Joshi as Rana
 Mukesh Rishi as Badshah Khan (Cameo)
 Avtar Gill as Police Commissioner
 Mushtaq Khan as Prem 
 Dinesh Hingoo as Principal Badra 
 Kunika as Sonia
 Gavin Packard as College Punk
 Achyut Potdar as Vijay's guardian
 Jack Gaud as Sonia's brother 
 Ali Asgar as Vijay's friend
 Lalit Tiwari as Girdhari

Soundtrack

The music of the film was composed Aadesh Shrivastav and the lyrics were penned by Shyam Raj . The soundtrack was released in 1996 on Audio Cassette in Trimurti Sounds and Big B Music which consists of 6 songs while Currently its copyright is with T-Series, link of online streaming audio songs https://gaana.com/album/shastra . The full album is recorded by Kumar Sanu, Udit Narayan,  Abhijeet Bhattacharya, Babul Supriyo, Vijeta Pandit, Poornima, Hema Sardesai, Sunidhi Chauhan, which she making debut as playback singer & Aditya Narayan.

"Kuch Hua Re Hua Re" - Babul Supriyo, Poornima
"Kya Ada Kya Jalwe" - Udit Narayan
"Ladki Deewani Ladka Deewana" - Udit Narayan, Aditya Narayan and Sunidhi Chauhan
"More Saiyan" - Hema Sardesai
"Shastra Shastra" - Abhijeet
"Wade Na Ho Kasme Na Ho" - Kumar Sanu, Vijeta Pandit

References

External links 
 

1996 films
1990s Hindi-language films
Films scored by Aadesh Shrivastava
Indian action films